21436 Chaoyichi provisional designation , is a background asteroid and binary system from the inner region of the asteroid belt, approximately 2 kilometers in diameter. It was discovered on 31 March 1998, by astronomers of the Lincoln Near-Earth Asteroid Research at Lincoln Laboratory's Experimental Test Site near Socorro, New Mexico, United States.

References

External links 
 Asteroids with Satellites, Robert Johnston, johnstonsarchive.net
 
 

021436
021436
Named minor planets
021436
19980331